Kerr Steamship Company, Kerr Company, ran passenger and cargo ships from New York City the Dutch East Indies, Ceylon, Egypt and other ports. Kerr Company was founded in 1916, and was sold to Norton Lilly International in 1994 after a Kerr-Norton joint venture that started in 1981. In the 1920s Kerr Steamship Company was the largest steamship company in the United States. Kerr Steamship Company served during World War I taking supplies to the War. Kerr Steamship Company opened an office at 7 Rue Scribe, Paris and ran dock's at Bordeaux. Later, Kerr Steamship Company opened operations in Marseilles, Chicago, and New Orleans to support the war effort. In the “K” Line shipping system, the Kerr Steamship Company shipped most and sometimes all the cargo in Atlantic Ocean, "K" Line-Kerr Corporation. In 1994 Kerr Company was the sub-agent for United Arab Shipping Company, and is an agent for Torm West Africa Line, Alliance Navigation, Compagnie Generale Maritime, and Compania Chilena de Navegacion Interoceanica. Kerr was the sub-agent in the South Atlantic region for the "K" Line America.

Early steamship

Early Kerr steamships:
SS Kerowlee (1901)
SS Kerlew  (1906)
SS Kermanshah (was Himalaia 1910)
SS Kerkenna   (was Borneo 1910)
SS Keresan   (was Erodiade 1910)
SS Kerwood    (was Budapest 1911)
SS Kermoor    (was Marawitz 1907)
SS Keresaspa    (was Franconia 1903)
SS Rochester sank 1917 by Uboat (was Yagüez )
SS Malama (1919)
 SS Shoshone (1911)
SS Mount Clay (1904)
SS DeKalb (1904)

World War II
Kerr-Silver line
SS Bowness Park
SS Mohawk Park 
SS Fort St. Antoine
SS Fort Dearborn

 Tanker:
Andrew Dillion  (1950s)

Kerr-Silver Services
Kerr-Silver Services 1920-1930's ships:
Silversandal
Silverteak
Silvercypress
Silveryew
Silverwalnut
Silverpalm
Silverwillow
Silvermaple
Silveroak
Silverelm
Silverguava
Silverbelle
Silverash
Silverbeech
Silverhazel
Silverlarch
Silverpine
Silvercypress
Silversandal
Silverteak
Silverwalnut
Silveryew

Prince Line:Services 1930's ships, working with Stanley & John Thompson of the United Kingdom (later merged with Java Pacific) : 
Chinese Prince
Cingalese Prince
Javanese Prince
Malayan Prince
Siamese Prince

See also
Yusuf bin Ahmed Kanoo

References 

Shipping companies of the United States